Operation Berlin may refer to:

Operation Berlin (Arnhem), a Second World War evacuation operation in the Netherlands
Operation Berlin (Atlantic), a Second World War German commerce raid in the Atlantic
Operation Berlín (Colombia), a 2000 Colombian Army ambush against the FARC

See also
 Battle of Berlin